Marion Alette Bultman (born 16 February 1960 in Oosterbeek) is a sailor from the Netherlands, who represented her country at the 1988 Summer Olympics in Pusan. With Henny Vegter as Helmsman, Bultman took the 13th place in the 470 Female. Bultman and Vegter were, with the exception of Mej. C. de Visser – substitute for the Star in 1936 –, the first female sailing competitors in the 88 years of Dutch Olympic sailing history.

Sources
 
 
 
 
 

1960 births
Living people
Dutch female sailors (sport)
Olympic sailors of the Netherlands

Sailors at the 1988 Summer Olympics – 470
People from Renkum
Sportspeople from Gelderland
20th-century Dutch women
21st-century Dutch women